Jos Hooiveld (born 22 April 1983) is a retired Dutch footballer. Hooiveld is known for his strong physical performances. 
 
Born in Zeijen, Drenthe, he started his career with Eredivisie club Heerenveen in 2003, before moving to Eerste Divisie side Zwolle, on loan, between 2004 and 2006. In 2006, he moved to Austrian Erste Liga side Kapfenberger SV and one year later moved to Finnish side Inter Turku. During his time there he won both the 2008 Veikkausliiga and 2008 League Cup as well as being named the defender of the year twice.

In 2009 Swedish side AIK signed him and he won the 2009 Allsvenskan and the 2009 Svenska Cupen. He moved to Scottish Premier League side Celtic in January 2010 but after one year was loaned out to Danish Superliga club Copenhagen. He then moved on loan to Championship club Southampton shortly after the start of the 2011–12 season before joining them permanently in December 2011. He was a regular throughout the season helping them win promotion to the Premier League. He spent the final year of his Southampton contract on loan to Norwich City and Millwall. In the summer of 2015 he once again signed for Swedish side AIK.

Club career

Heerenveen
Hooiveld started his professional career for Heerenveen in 2003, when he came on as a substitute for Petter Hansson. In the next season he made twelve appearances in the League mostly as a left back, starting in five of those matches which included wins over Ajax and PSV. He could not force his way to the first team the following season and was loaned to Zwolle in January 2005 for 18 months. He left the club in the summer of 2006 joining Austrian club Kapfenberg.

Zwolle
Hooiveld made his debut for Zwolle in February 2005 in a 0–0 draw, playing as a left back. He played most of his matches for the club at left back, with brief moves to midfield and central defence. In total he made 44 League appearances during his loan spell scoring three goals.

Kapfenberger SV
Hooiveld's football career almost ended due to problems with the club and management. In April 2007, after just eight months at the club and having made just fourteen appearances, Hooiveld signed a two-year contract with Inter Turku.

Inter Turku
In his first season with Inter Turku, Hooiveld was voted as the Most Valuable Player in the Finnish League Cup and after the season he was chosen as the best player of the season by a Finnish magazine Iltalehti and was also named Veikkausliiga defender of the season. In the beginning of the 2008 season he won the League Cup, when FC Inter beat their local rival Turun Palloseura in the final. He went on to help the club to its first ever league title. He was again named Veikkausliiga defender of the season for the second time in only two years in Finland – impressively FC Inter kept 16 clean sheets in the League in 26 matches in which Hooiveld played. After making 52 league appearances and scoring four goals in two successful years in Finland, he signed for AIK in January 2009.

AIK
Hooiveld made his debut for AIK on 5 April 2009 in a 1–0 win over Halmstad in Allsvenskan. He won the Allsvenskan in 2009 with AIK, the first time the club had won it in eleven years. The club also won Svenska Cupen in 2009, making it the first time ever AIK had done the Double.

Hooiveld made a total of 31 appearances for the club during his one season. Mikael Stahre wished Hooiveld well on his move commenting "Jos has, during this year, helped and contributed to the winning mentality that characterizes AIK. Idols come and go, AIK remains. We wish him well in his future career."

Celtic
On 11 January 2010, Celtic announced that Hooiveld had signed a three and a half-year deal with the club, moving for a fee of around £2,000,000. Hooiveld was given the number 16 shirt, vacated by Willo Flood after his transfer to Middlesbrough. He made his debut for Celtic against Hamilton Academical on 30 January 2010. In his following game, against Kilmarnock, Hooiveld went off with a thigh injury, and did not make another appearance for Celtic that season.

The following season, Hooiveld was given the number 6 shirt after Landry N'Guemo returned to AS Nancy. He made his European debut for the Glasgow side in a 3–0 Champions League defeat to Portuguese side Braga on 28 July 2010. He lost his place in the team after giving away a penalty in a 4–0 Europa League defeat to FC Utrecht a month later, before returning as a substitute in the 9–0 win over Aberdeen in November 2010.

Copenhagen
On 19 January 2011, Hooiveld joined Copenhagen on loan until the end of the season. Hooiveld made 11 appearances for Copenhagen (four as a substitute) but on 28 May 2011 the club announced that they would not be taking up the option to make the move permanent.

Southampton
On 31 August 2011, the final day of the summer transfer window, Hooiveld joined Southampton on a loan deal until January 2012. On 21 September 2011, he scored his first goal in a 2–1 victory over Preston North End in the League Cup. On 18 October, he scored his first league goal in a 1–0 victory over West Ham United, a win which put the Saints five points clear at the top of the table.

After impressing during his loan spell, the transfer was made permanent on 1 December 2011, the fee undisclosed. Southampton were able to sign him outside of the transfer window because he was already registered as their player. He scored for the second time against West Ham United in a 1–1 draw. He then made it two goals in as many games just days later in a 4–0 victory over Derby County. He scored on the final day of the season to help send the club back to the Premier League in a 4–0 victory over Coventry. This was his eighth goal of the campaign, seven of which had been in the league.

On 26 January 2015, Hooiveld joined Millwall on loan for the remainder of the season, having previously been on loan at Norwich City. At Millwall he scored once in a 2-1 win over Charlton Athletic.

AIK
On 10 July 2015 it was announced that Hooiveld signed a 2.5 year deal with AIK.

He scored his first goal with the club in a match against GIF Sundsvall

Twente
On 25 January 2017, Hooiveld joined Twente on a contract until the summer of 2018.

Orange County
On 5 June 2018, Hooiveld signed for California-based Orange County of the United Soccer League. On 30 December, Hooiveld announced that he was retiring from football on Instagram.

Honours
Inter Turku
Veikkausliiga: 2008
Finnish League Cup: 2008

AIK
Allsvenskan: 2009
Svenska Cupen: 2009

Copenhagen
Danish Superliga: 2010–11

Southampton
Football League Championship runners-up: 2011–12

Individual
Veikkausliiga Defender of the Year: 2007, 2008
Allsvenskan Player of the Year: 2009

References

External links
 Official player profile at saintsfc.co.uk
 
 
 Netherlands youth at OnsOranje

1983 births
Living people
People from Tynaarlo
Association football central defenders
Dutch footballers
Netherlands youth international footballers
Kapfenberger SV players
SC Heerenveen players
PEC Zwolle players
FC Inter Turku players
AIK Fotboll players
Celtic F.C. players
F.C. Copenhagen players
Southampton F.C. players
Norwich City F.C. players
Millwall F.C. players
FC Twente players
Orange County SC players
Eredivisie players
Eerste Divisie players
Austrian Football Bundesliga players
Veikkausliiga players
Allsvenskan players
Scottish Premier League players
Danish Superliga players
English Football League players
Premier League players
Dutch expatriate footballers
Expatriate footballers in Austria
Expatriate footballers in Finland
Expatriate footballers in Sweden
Dutch expatriate sportspeople in Finland
Expatriate footballers in Scotland
Expatriate men's footballers in Denmark
Expatriate footballers in England
Expatriate soccer players in the United States
USL Championship players
Achilles 1894 players
Dutch expatriate sportspeople in Scotland
Dutch expatriate sportspeople in Denmark
Dutch expatriate sportspeople in Sweden
Dutch expatriate sportspeople in Austria
Dutch expatriate sportspeople in England
Dutch expatriate sportspeople in the United States
Footballers from Drenthe
Jong FC Twente players